John Bosom (died 1440), of Bosomzeal, Dittisham, Devon, was an English politician.

He was a Member (MP) of the Parliament of England for Dartmouth in 1395
and January 1397 and for Totnes in 1411.

References

14th-century births
1440 deaths
Members of the Parliament of England (pre-1707) for Totnes
English MPs 1395
English MPs January 1397
English MPs 1411
High Sheriffs of Devon
Members of the Parliament of England for Dartmouth